Besses o' th' Barn is a tram stop in the suburban area of Besses o' th' Barn, Greater Manchester, England. It is on the Bury Line of Greater Manchester's light rail Metrolink system.

History

Although the line was built in 1879 by the Lancashire & Yorkshire Railway, it was not until 1 February 1933 that Besses o' th' Barn railway station was opened by the London, Midland and Scottish Railway, to cater for a large new housing development in the area. In 1992 the station, which was on the national rail network, became a stop on the Metrolink network. The station is in the network's Ticketing Zone B. It is unique, as it is the only original station on the Bury-Manchester line to have one island platform.

The original Totem Signs were the one of two to include lower case lettering, the other being London Road (Guildford).

Services
Services mostly run every 12 minutes on 2 routes, forming a 6-minute service between Bury and Manchester at peak times.

Connections
Go North West's frequent 135 service runs between Bury and Manchester and stops adjacent to the station , as well as the Route 97 which runs between Bury and Manchester via Unsworth. Route 95, operated by Go North West runs between Pendleton and Whitefield and calls next to Besses United Reformed Church as does the Route 98, operated by Go North West which runs between Bury and Manchester via Radcliffe and Prestwich. Arriva North West 484 service also ran to Whitefield and to Eccles via Swinton until Late 2020.

References

External links

Besses o' th' Barn Stop Information
Besses o' th' Barn area map

Tram stops in the Metropolitan Borough of Bury
Former London, Midland and Scottish Railway stations
Railway stations in Great Britain opened in 1933
Railway stations in Great Britain closed in 1991
Railway stations in Great Britain opened in 1992
Tram stops on the Altrincham to Bury line
Tram stops on the Bury to Ashton-under-Lyne line
Besses o' th' Barn